Rwamagana Solar Power Station is an 8.5MW solar power plant in Rwanda, the fourth-largest economy in the East African Community.

Location
The coordinates of the power station are:2°01'34.0"S, 30°22'38.0"E (Latitude:-2.026111; Longitude:30.377222).

Overview
In July 2013, the government of Rwanda contracted with GigaWatt Global, a Dutch firm, to develop an 8.5 Megawatt solar power plant in Rwamagana District, Eastern Province, for a contract price of US$23 million (RwF:15 billion). GigaWatt Global would finance, build, own and operate the facility for 25 years, with the power produced sold to Rwanda Energy, the national electricity utility.

In February 2014, GigaWatt Global was able to reach financial closure, allowing construction to begin. Interconnection to the national electricity grid was achieved in July 2014, and by September 2014, the power plant was producing at maximum capacity. The power station consists of 28,360 individual photovoltaic panels spread out on a  field. The final construction price, including the cost to access the national grid came to US$23.7 million. Funding came from multiple sources, including (a) Netherlands Development Finance Company (b) Emerging Africa Infrastructure Fund and (c) Norfund. The United States Overseas Private Investment Corporation and Finland's Energy and Environment Partnership provided grants.

See also

References

External links
Kenya Joins Big Investors In Renewable Energy As East Africa Plays Catch-Up

Solar power stations in Rwanda
Energy in Rwanda